Mikalay Autukhovich (born 7 January 1963) is a Belarusian businessman and political dissident who has twice been imprisoned by the government of Belarus. Belarusian courts have found him guilty of tax evasion and terrorism, but international human rights organization Amnesty International has stated that he is a prisoner of conscience imprisoned solely for peaceful protest.

Life 
Prior to his arrest, Autukhovich worked at the Vaukavysk-based taxi company Nika-taxi 22222. He also ran as an opposition candidate in the 2004 Belarusian parliamentary elections.

On 7 July 2006, he was arrested and charged with "large scale tax evasion and running business without a registration and a license". He was found guilty on both counts and sentenced to three-and-a-half years' home arrest. He was released in early 2009 following "pressure from the European Union and the United States".

Shortly after his release, he was charged with involvement in a 2005 arson case, along with two other activists. Authorities later added additional charges of illegal weapons possession and "preparing a terrorist act". Autukhovich responded to the charges with a three-month hunger strike that lasted from February to April of that year, demanding that he be allowed to face to trial. In May, Autukhovich was tried, and while the terrorism charge against him was dropped, he was convicted of illegal possession of weapons and ammunition and given a five-year, two-month prison sentence.

Autukhovich served his sentence in a labor camp in Ivatsevichy. He reportedly lacked legal representation after his lawyer, Paval Sapelka, was disbarred for representing opposition presidential candidate Andrei Sannikov in court. In December 2011, prison officials reported that Autukhovich had attempted suicide by slashing his wrists, but had survived and was in stable condition. According to the Viasna Human Rights Centre, following the incident, he was moved into a "closed regime", largely isolating him from contact with other prisoners.

Radio Free Europe has described Autukhovich as being regarded as a political prisoner by "activists at home and abroad". Amnesty International has named him a prisoner of conscience and called for his immediate release.

Arrest in 2020 
In December 2020, Autukhovich was arrested again. Investigators accuse Autukhovich of conducting several arson attacks against vehicles belonging to police officers and planning of attacks on their property. Autukhovich has rejected all of the charges. As for now, Autuchovich has been on a hunger strike in prison for 22 days and nothing is known about his conditions for three days after he fell during the trial proceedings.

On October 17, 2022, the Hrodna Regional Court sentenced Autukhovich to 25 years in jail.

References

Amnesty International prisoners of conscience held by Belarus
Belarusian businesspeople
Belarusian democracy activists
Belarusian dissidents
Belarusian prisoners and detainees
Living people
1963 births
People convicted of illegal possession of weapons